Bianca Lorenz-Baptiste (born 15 January 1992) is an English footballer who plays as a forward for Watford FC. She was the top scorer for Tottenham Hotspur in 2017.

Club career
Baptiste was born in England in 1992. She played in the youth system of Arsenal and moved up from the Enfield Town under-16s into their first team for the 2008–09 season.

She is an attacker. She played for ten years with Tottenham Hotspur as a semi-professional until the team decided to go fully professional. The team had done well and in 2017 Baptiste was their top goal scorer when they won the 2016–17 FA Women's Premier League Southern Division title. She also scored two goals in the 3–0 Championship play-off win over Northern Champions Blackburn Rovers, which secured promotion to FA WSL 2.

Tottenham were promoted again when they finished second behind Manchester United in the 2018–19 FA Women's Championship. The management team decided to not include Baptiste in the players they made professional for entry to the top division. Seven new players were announced for the team in July 2019. Only about half the team was retained and eleven players had to find a new role, including Sarah Wiltshire and Emma Beckett, who was a recent signing. Baptiste felt rejected and considered leaving the game, she was labelled "Spurs Ladies Nutrition Coach and Personal Trainer" and that appeared to be her new role in the team. She did get some support and she was able to find a new home at another London team – Crystal Palace.

During the 2020–21 season she appeared 25 times for Crystal Palace, scoring 14 goals for the club. In a match against Bristol City she scored two goals, but Bristol replied with four and went on to win the championship.

In January 2022 she was brought on as a substitute for Leigh Nicol during a match with Lewes when her team were losing. She was credited with reviving her team's game leading to a 3–1 victory over Lewes. The manager noted her goal and her contribution after a pass from Molly Sharpe. In the following month, they played London Bees and Baptiste either scored or assisted all of her team's five goals.

Baptiste moved early in July 2022 to Watford Women FC to join them for their 2022/2023 season.

References

External links

Personal training website

1992 births
Living people
English women's footballers
Women's association football forwards
Arsenal W.F.C. players
Tottenham Hotspur F.C. Women players
Crystal Palace F.C. (Women) players
FA Women's National League players
Black British sportswomen
English people of Saint Vincent and the Grenadines descent